The Crucified Christ (MA 2005.274) is a sculpture in walrus ivory, probably from Paris c 1300, now in The Cloisters, New York. It is lined with traces of paint and gilding. Although small in scale, it is structured in a monumental style. It shows the dead and crucified body of Christ; in the 12th century the dead Christ was widely seen as representing human suffering. This work is noted for its high quality craftsmanship, and the subtle and sensitive rendering of the torso. The stunted legs are a notable and somewhat inexplicable feature.

The sculpture is badly damaged; both arms, which would have been made separately, are missing. It is one of the few surviving northern European ivory statuettes of its kind (about 50 are known), popular in Paris around 1300, and is arguably the finest of its kind. It was likely intended to be hung above an altar, as a visible symbol of the sacrifice of the Son of God; it would have been seen as a testament to his triumph over death.

It was in a private collection in Argentina from 1964, before its acquisition by the Metropolitan Museum of Art in 2005.

Notes

Bibliography

Further reading
 
 

Crucifixes
Ivory works of art
Sculptures of the Metropolitan Museum of Art
Statues of Jesus